This is a list of tennis players who have represented the Portugal Davis Cup team in an official Davis Cup match. Portugal has taken part in the Davis Cup since 1925.

Players

''Current through 2017 Davis Cup Europe/Africa Zone Group I Second round.

ITF Commitment Award
The following players have received the ITF Commitment Award from the International Tennis Federation for having competed in a minimum of 20 home or away ties or 50 ties at any level of the competition (including Zone Group Events) over their career.

Emanuel Couto
João Cunha e Silva
Frederico Gil
Rui Machado
Nuno Marques
João Sousa
Leonardo Tavares

References

Lists of Davis Cup tennis players
Davis